Dean Van Schoiack is an American politician in the Missouri House of Representatives, first elected in November 2020 to represent District 9, and is a member of the Republican Party (United States).

Missouri House of Representatives

Committee assignments 

 Agriculture Policy
 Downsizing State Government
 Special Committee on Criminal Justice

Electoral history

References

Republican Party members of the Missouri House of Representatives
People from St. Joseph, Missouri
Year of birth missing (living people)
Living people